The voiced alveolo-palatal sibilant fricative is a type of consonantal sound, used in some spoken languages. It is the sibilant equivalent of the voiced palatal fricative.

Features

Features of the voiced alveolo-palatal fricative:

Occurrence

See also
 Index of phonetics articles

Notes

References

External links
 

Alveolo-palatal consonants
Fricative consonants
Pulmonic consonants
Co-articulated consonants
Voiced oral consonants
Central consonants